X5 or X-5 may refer to:

Businesses and organizations
 X5 Music Group, a record label based in Sweden
 X5 Retail, formerly the largest retailer in Russia

Electronics
 GE X5, a bridge digital camera
 iAUDIO X5, a portable digital audio player
 Korg X5, a synthesizer
 Nokia X5, a mobile telephone
 Pentax X-5, a digital superzoom camera
 Sony Xperia X5 Pureness, a mobile telephone

Media

Characters
 X-5, a character from the animated television series Atomic Betty
 X5, a group of super-soldiers in the television series Dark Angel

Video games
 Mega Man X5, the fifth game in the Mega Man X series

Technology
 X Five, a gene-sequencing machine in the HiSeq series produced by the San Diego-based biotech firm Illumina
 Xitami X5, an open-source Web server

Transportation

Air transportation
 Bell X-5, an experimental aircraft
 X5, the IATA code for Afrique Airlines

Automobiles
 BMW X5, a 1999–present German mid-size SUV
 Cowin X5, a 2017–2021 Chinese compact SUV
 Domy X5, a 2015–2018 Chinese compact SUV
 Forthing Jingyi X5, a 2013–2021 Chinese compact crossover
 Hanteng X5, a 2016–2022 Chinese compact SUV
 Landwind X5, a 2012–2020 Chinese compact SUV
 Beijing X5, a 2015-present Chinese compact SUV
 Oshan X5, a 2020–present Chinese compact SUV
 Rely X5, a 2010–2011 Chinese compact SUV

Bus services
 Stagecoach X5, a bus service between Oxford and Bedford (previously Cambridge), England
 X5 (New York City bus)
 X5 Bristol–Weston-super-Mare, a bus service in England

Trains
 SJ X5, a Swedish trainset

See also
 5X (disambiguation)